Haijian 23 is a China Marine Surveillance (CMS) ship in the 1st Marine Surveillance Flotilla of its North China Sea Fleet. Haijian 23 was christened and commissioned on January 6, 2011, at her home port of Qingdao. Haijian 23 has been frequently conducting cruise operations in territorial waters around Diaoyu Islands.

Cruise operations 
On June 14, 2013, Haijian 23, together with Haijian 51 and Haijian 49, conducted law enforcement cruise operations in territorial waters around Diaoyu Islands.

Haijian 23 was renamed China Coast Guard 1123 in July 2013 under the unified, newly reestablished China Coast Guard. CCG-1123 has been continuously involved in patrol operations in Chinese territorial waters around Diaoyu Islands.

References

Ships of the China Marine Surveillance